Duke Gong of Cao (? – 618 BCE) was the seventeenth ruler of the vassal State of Cao during the Chinese Spring and Autumn period (770 – 475 BCE). Born Ji Xiang (姬襄), he was the son of Duke Zhao of Cao.

In 637 BCE, during the exile of Chong’er, son of Duke Xian of Jin, Duke Gong heard that Chong’er suffered from fused ribs in a parallel way that makes it look like one rib bone(which was considered as the sign of saints in ancient times) and wanted to see for himself. Chong’er caught Duke Gong spying on him whilst he bathed and described the Duke as a man of “unbelievable rudeness”.

After Chong’er became Duke Wen of Jin and one of the Five Hegemons, in 632 he used Duke Gòng's previous rudeness as an excuse to overthrow the State of Cao. Duke Gòng was captured by the State of Jin but later released.

After Duke Gong of Cao died in 618 BCE, his son Duke Wen of Cao became ruler.

References

Zhou dynasty people
618 BC deaths
Year of birth unknown
7th-century BC Chinese monarchs